96 athletes (69 men and 27 women) from Italy competed at the 1988 Summer Paralympics in Seoul, South Korea.

Medals by sport

Medalists

Gold

Silver

Bronze

See also
Italy at the Paralympics
Italy at the 1988 Summer Olympics

References 

Nations at the 1988 Summer Paralympics
1988
Summer Paralympics